Never Land is the first EP by American Christian hip hop artist Andy Mineo, released on January 28, 2014. It follows up to his 2013 studio album Heroes for Sale.

Reception

Commercial performance
The EP debuted at number 13 on the Billboard 200 with 26,000 copies sold in its first week.  The album has sold 72,000 copies in the US as of September 2015.

Track list

Charts

References

2014 debut EPs
Andy Mineo albums
Reach Records albums
Albums produced by Gawvi
Albums produced by Andy Mineo
Albums produced by Beam